Shōgun is a military rank and historical title in Japan.

Shogun may also refer to:
Shōgun (novel), 1975, by James Clavell
Shōgun (1980 miniseries), 1980, based on the novel
Shōgun (upcoming miniseries), also based on the novel
Shōgun: The Musical, 1990
Shogun (video game), 1986
James Clavell's Shōgun, a 1989 interactive fiction computer game
Shogun (toolbox), an open source software library for C++
Shogun (Trivium album)
Shogun (Stormwitch album)
Shogun (1986 board game), from Milton Bradley
Shogun (2006 board game), by Dirk Henn
Shogun: Total War, a 2000 video game
Total War: Shogun 2, a 2011 video game
Mitsubishi Pajero or Mitsubishi Shogun, an SUV
Mitsubishi Fuso Super Great or Mitsubishi Shogun, a heavy-duty truck
Maurício Rua (born 1981), nicknamed "Shogun", mixed martial artist
Shogun (horse), a racehorse that won the Coventry Stakes in 1912
Shogun, a limited production batch of customized Ford Festivas
Shogun, a brand of bicycle by Falcon Cycles
"Shogun" (Legends of Tomorrow), an episode of Legends of Tomorrow
Shogun (Marvel Comics)

See also
Shogun Warriors (toys), a product line by Mattel
Shogunzords, colossal mechanical or bio-mechanical robotic Zords in the Power Rangers franchise